MTV ao Vivo (Portuguese for "MTV Live") may refer to:

 MTV ao Vivo (Nando Reis e Os Infernais album), 2004
 MTV ao Vivo (Skank album), 2001
 MTV ao Vivo (Titãs album), 2005
 MTV ao Vivo: Bailão do Ruivão, an album by Nando Reis e Os Infernais, 2009
 MTV ao Vivo – Eletrodoméstico, an album by Daniela Mercury, 2003
 MTV ao Vivo, an album by Marcelo Camelo, 2010
 MTV ao Vivo, an album by Planet Hemp, 2001

See also
 List of MTV series albums
 MTV Live (disambiguation)